Oxon Hill is an unincorporated area and census-designated place (CDP) in southern Prince George's County, Maryland, United States. Oxon Hill is a suburb of Washington, located southeast of the downtown district and east of Alexandria, Virginia. It contains the new  National Harbor development on the shore of the Potomac River.

For the 1990 and 2000 censuses, the United States Census Bureau defined a census-designated place consisting of Oxon Hill and the adjacent community of Glassmanor, designated Oxon Hill-Glassmanor, for statistical purposes. As of the 2010 census, Oxon Hill was delineated separately and had a population of 17,722. Per the 2020 census, the population was 18,791.

History

Oxon Hill was named for the colonial 18th century manor home of Thomas Addison (which burned in 1895 but was replaced in 1929 by a large 49-room neo-Georgian-style home called Oxon Hill Manor, standing on a bluff over the Potomac River). The current Manor is now owned by the Maryland-National Capital Park and Planning Commission and is used for cultural activities, as well as being rented for weddings and special events. "Oxon" is an abbreviation for the Latin Oxoniensis, meaning "of Oxford."  The area now known as Oxon Hill reminded Addison of the area near Oxford, England. The Revolutionary patriot John Hanson died while visiting the first Manor, and may be buried there in an unmarked grave.

Oxon Hill Manor, the Butler House, Oxon Cove Park, and St. Ignatius Church are listed on the National Register of Historic Places.

Today the community is bisected by the busy Capital Beltway (I-95/495), and is near the interstate Woodrow Wilson Bridge. The enlarged bridge was opened December 15, 2008, and highway interchanges and ramps near the bridge were also re-aligned and re-configured. Prior to that date, traffic backed up into Oxon Hill daily for decades as 250,000–300,000 vehicles a day crossed the Wilson Bridge.

Oxon Hill includes many garden apartment and townhouse communities along with single-family detached homes built mostly between the 1940s when suburban development began, through the early 1990s (except for the newer National Harbor condominiums), including the incorporated town Forest Heights. Oxon Hill's two principal shopping centers ("Rivertowne", built about 1985 which includes a K-Mart, Safeway, Staples, Ross Stores Inc. and Home Depot, and "Eastover", built about 1955) attract neighborhood customers as well as shoppers from nearby Southeast Washington, D.C. Eastover, located at the D.C./state line, is a hub of many bus routes, some of them operating 24 hours a day, and has a Prince George's County Police station. The apartment communities closest to the D.C. line are informally called by their original name "Glassmanor", although rental companies have officially given them newer names. Rather unusual community features of Oxon Hill are a nursing home and a large cultural center, both operated for an ethnic Filipino population who are numerous in Oxon Hill and Fort Washington. A Walmart was scheduled to open in 2014 but has since been delayed for site layout revisions.

Until about 1960, the community used the mailing address Washington, D.C., before getting its own postal designation. About 1980, the United States Postal Service detached the two-thirds of greater Oxon Hill that was furthest from Washington, D.C. and re-defined that part as a new postal designation, Fort Washington, MD. To make mail sorting easier at that time, the new postal boundary line separating the two Maryland communities was drawn along already existing zip code boundaries. (The former zip 20021 portion of Oxon Hill remained Oxon Hill with the new code 20745, while everything in the former zip 20022 portion of Oxon Hill about 1980 was automatically renamed the new Fort Washington 20744.) Illogically, this partitioning reassigned some areas that seem to be almost in the heart of Oxon Hill (such as all of the Bock Road, Tucker Road, Murray Hills, and Brinkley Road areas, including several large prominent churches, Rosecroft Raceway, the ice rink, and ironically even Oxon Hill Middle School) to Fort Washington mailing addresses, which can cause confusion.

Geography
The CDP lies directly south of the Capital Beltway (I-495/I-95), just east of the Woodrow Wilson Bridge over the Potomac River.

Demographics

2020 census

Note: the US Census treats Hispanic/Latino as an ethnic category. This table excludes Latinos from the racial categories and assigns them to a separate category. Hispanics/Latinos can be of any race.

Parks and recreation
Rosecroft Raceway (founded in 1949) and Henson Creek Golf Course (a nine-hole course) are among Oxon Hill's recreational attractions; Rosecroft Raceway offers a limited number of harness horse racing dates throughout the year, as well as betting on select televised simulcast races from around the country (per article in Washington Post, May 20, 2010). (The Maryland slot machine referendum in November 2008 did not include Rosecroft in its list of possible sites to add slots.)

The Parks Commission's 1974 Tucker Road ice skating rink, at the Tucker Road Athletic Complex, was enclosed and expanded to year-round use in 2005; across from it is the Tucker Road Community Center and nearby is a private swimming club, the Oxon Hill Recreation Club (OHRC). OHRC has been in continuous operation since 1958. A 37,000 square foot gymnasium and recreation and learning center (Southern Regional Technology & Recreation Complex) opened in 2013, on Bock Road.  The Henson Creek paved hiker-biker trail extends  paralleling Henson Creek, a tributary to the Potomac River. Oxon Cove Farm (formerly Oxon Hill Children's Farm) is a free of charge, educational facility operated daily for families by the National Park Service. Its future is uncertain because it is located in the shadow of National Harbor. The farm also has a bicycle trail used by a few commuters to nearby government facilities. Public indoor and outdoor swimming pools are also located on Allentown Road near Padgett's Corner at the Allentown Splash, Tennis and Fitness Park.

The first phase of the development began opening in April 2008, and is currently  well into its second phase.

The MGM National Harbor Resort Casino, located at the entrance to the National Harbor development and a $950 million project, opened on December 8, 2016.

Education

Primary and secondary schools
Residents are zoned to Prince George's County Public Schools (PGCPS):

Elementary schools serving sections of the CDP include Apple Grove, Avalon, J. Frank Dent, Flintstone, Oxon Hill, Valley View and Tayac.

Middle schools serving the CDP include Isaac J. Gourdine, Oxon Hill, and Thurgood Marshall.

High schools serving sections of the CDP include Oxon Hill High School, Crossland High School, and Friendly High School. Oxon Hill High has a magnet science and technology program, which is offered at only three of the county's high schools; The original buildings from 1959 have been completely replaced by a new facility, which opened in August 2013.

Another magnet school in Oxon Hill is the K–8 Maya Angelou French Immersion School whose mission is to ensure that all students acquire knowledge and skills, through speaking, reading and writing the French language. The French Immersion school is also attached to the John Hanson Montessori School which upholds the teaching ideals of Italian educator Maria Montessori. Both are located in the former John Hanson Junior High School building, which is next door to the main Oxon Hill post office.

There is a Roman Catholic private school, St. Columba School. It was established in 1962.

Public libraries
Prince George's County Memorial Library System operates the Oxon Hill Library. It completely remodeled and reopened in 2005. Originally built in 1967, the Oxon Hill Library Branch contains the Sojourner Truth Room, an African American research collection. This comprehensive collection of reference materials on African American history and culture includes over 16,000 cataloged items (many are rare or out-of-print), periodicals, sheet music by African American composers, pictures and posters. Vertical files contain pamphlets, clippings and bibliographies. Copies of selected materials are also in the Oxon Hill Branch's circulating collection. An extensive collection of current and historical periodicals, including the NAACP's Crisis from 1910, the Journal of Negro History from 1916 and Ebony from 1945. The collection includes original editions of some slave narratives, as well as many reprint editions and the thirty-one volume Writer's Project series. Other topics are antislavery and slavery tracts, literary criticism, and the history of African Americans in Maryland and Prince George's County.

Government
Prince George's County Police Department District 4 Station in Glassmanor CDP, with an Oxon Hill postal address, serves the community.

The U.S. Postal Service operates the Oxon Hill Post Office in the CDP.

Infrastructure

Major roads

Notable people
John H. Bayne, Union Army physician, horticulturist, and member of the Maryland House of Delegates and Senate. The land that his plantation, "Salubria", once occupied is directly adjacent to National Harbor and is now the location of Tanger Outlets shopping complex.
Singer Eva Cassidy, who rose to prominence in United Kingdom after her untimely death in 1996 at age 33 from cancer, lived with her family in Oxon Hill in her early years.
Ronald Darby, cornerback for NFL's Denver Broncos; born in Oxon Hill and attended Potomac High School.
Roger L. Easton, Naval scientist, chief inventor of GPS, winner of 2004 Presidential National Medal of Technology; lived on Oxon Hill Road (more information is on "Google images").
 Actress Taraji P. Henson, winner of Golden Globe award for TV series Empire, nominee for Academy Award for Best Supporting Actress in 2009, attended Oxon Hill High School.
G. Gordon Liddy, FBI bureau chief, lawyer, Richard Nixon's White House Staff Assistant, key Watergate figure, author, and nationally syndicated radio talk show host.
U.S. Senator George McGovern, Democratic presidential candidate, and family lived briefly in Glassmanor while a freshman U.S. congressman.
Sammy Nestico, distinguished band music composer/arranger, lived in Birchwood City in 1960s.
Jason Reynolds (born December 6, 1983), American author of novels and poetry for young adult and middle-grade audiences, grew up in Oxon Hill and has drawn inspiration for his books from his childhood experiences there.
Arnie Sachs (1928–2006), photojournalist, took famous photo of teenager Bill Clinton shaking hands with President John F. Kennedy
Sumner Welles, U.S. Undersecretary of State to Franklin D. Roosevelt, lived in second "Oxon Hill Manor" home and hosted Roosevelt and possibly Sir Winston Churchill there. Home was later occupied by Fred Maloof (wealthy oilman, timberland tycoon, and art collector) before coming into ownership of Maryland-National Capital Park and Planning Commission.
Tavon Young, cornerback for NFL's Baltimore Ravens, fourth-round pick out of Temple University, graduate of Potomac High School.

References

External links

 Oxon Cove National Park
 Grimes Family papers at the University of Maryland Libraries documents the line of Post Masters in the area throughout the nineteenth century. Oxon Hill was then known as Grimesville.

 
Census-designated places in Maryland
Census-designated places in Prince George's County, Maryland